The Trust for Public Land is a U.S. nonprofit organization with a mission to "create parks and protect land for people, ensuring healthy, livable communities for generations to come". Since its founding in 1972, the Trust for Public Land has completed 5,000 park-creation and land conservation projects across the United States, protected over 3 million acres, and helped pass more than 500 ballot measures—creating $70 billion in voter-approved public funding for parks and open spaces. The Trust for Public Land also researches and publishes authoritative data about parks, open space, conservation finance, and urban climate change adaptation. Headquartered in San Francisco, the organization is among the largest U.S. conservation nonprofits, with approximately 30 field offices across the U.S., including a federal affairs function in Washington, D.C.

Focus areas 
Consistent with its "Land for People" mission, the Trust for Public Land is widely known for urban conservation work, including New York City playgrounds and community gardens, Chicago's 606 linear park, Los Angeles green alleys, Climate-Smart Cities programs in 20 American cities, and "The 10-Minute Walk" initiative, which aims to put a high-quality park or open space within a 10-minute walk of every resident of every U.S. urban census tract.

The Trust for Public Land simultaneously focuses on public access-oriented land protection, such as additions to Yosemite National Park, the Appalachian Trail, Cape Cod National Seashore, and other national, state, and municipal parks across America. The organization also prioritizes projects that celebrate and advance social equity, like helping to create Martin Luther King Jr. National Historical Park, the Stonewall National Monument, and the Kashia Coastal Reserve.

Although the Trust for Public Land is an accredited land trust, the organization differs from conventional land trusts in that it does not generally hold or steward conservation property interests. Instead, the Trust for Public Land works with community members, public agencies, and other conservation non-governmental organizations (NGOs) to identify park-creation and land protection projects, and then helps plan, fund, protect, and/or create those spaces, with ownership of any resulting property interests typically transferring to local, state, or federal public agencies, or to other conservation NGOs.

In addition to creating parks and protecting open spaces, the Trust for Public Land is a leading advocate for public conservation funding at the local, state, and federal levels. Through campaigns, ballot measures, and legislative advocacy, the organization works—often in concert with its affiliated 501(c)(4) nonprofit, the Trust for Public Land Action Fund—to ensure adequate funding for many of the federal and state public funding programs relied on by public park and conservation agencies, and by conservation NGOs.

The Trust for Public Land also researches, publishes, and contributes to many authoritative national databases and platforms providing information about U.S. parks, protected open spaces, conservation finance, and urban climate risks, including ParkScore, ParkServe, Parkology, The Conservation Alamanac, the National Conservation Easement Database, LandVote, and "Climate-Smart Cities" Decision Support Tools.

Strategies, programs and initiatives 
 Parks for People, a strategy for providing close-to-home access to nature through parks, playgrounds, trails, community gardens, and other outdoor public spaces in U.S. cities, towns, and suburbs .
 Our Land, a strategy for protecting wild, working, and other open spaces, with an emphasis on enabling public access to natural areas for outdoor recreation.
 Climate-Smart Cities™ program, which helps municipalities assess climate risks, develop resilience strategies, and identify sites for parks, greenways, and other multi-benefit green infrastructure, using GIS -based, city-specific decision support tools.
 10-Minute Walk campaign—a collaboration with the National Recreation and Park Association and Urban Land Institute—which seeks to ensure that everyone in urban America lives within a 10-minute walk of a high-quality park or open space. Since this initiative's 2017 launch, 200 U.S. mayors have taken the 10-Minute Walk Pledge for their cities.
 Center for City Park Excellence, which provides "research on parks and works to create, improve, and promote urban parks", and maintains the Trust for Public Land's ParkServe, ParkScore, and Parkology platforms, which provide, respectively, maps and data about 14,000 U.S. municipal park systems, park system rankings for America's 100 largest cities, and information about how communities can create and steward high-quality parks.

 Services 
 Plan – The Trust for Public Land provides GIS-based spatial analysis services, including greenprinting, greenway and trail planning, and large landscape analysis. 
 Fund – The organization advocates for public conservation funding by providing technical assistance, campaign services, research data, and conservation economics analyses.
 Protect – The Trust for Public Land works with willing sellers, public agencies, and conservation nonprofits to negotiate, structure, fund, and complete the conservation real estate transactions that result in the acquisition and protection of land for parks and open spaces.
 Create – The organization helps communities plan, site, design, construct, and restore parks, using community engagement, participatory design, and creative placemaking techniques.

 History 
The Trust for Public Land was founded in San Francisco in 1972 by Huey Johnson, the former western regional director of The Nature Conservancy, and other San Francisco Bay Area and national lawyers and conservationists. Johnson's goal was to create an organization that would use emerging real estate, legal, and financial techniques to conserve land for human use and public benefit. An additional founding goal was to extend the conservation and environmental movements to cities, where an increasingly large segment of the population lived. Early Trust for Public Land programs of the 1970s and '80s included:
 The Urban Land Program, which led to the creation of parks and gardens in Oakland, California, San Francisco, New York City, Newark, New Jersey, and other cities.
 The Public Land Program, which included transactions that helped create the Golden Gate National Recreation Area, Cuyahoga Valley National Park, and the Sawtooth National Recreation Area in Idaho, among other parks and preserves.
 The Land Trust Program'', which helped found or train about one-third of the nation's then-existing local land trusts. In the 1980s, the Trust for Public Land joined other groups to found the Land Trust Alliance, in order to train and support local land trusts.

The Trust for Public Land Action Fund 
As a 501(c)(3) nonprofit, the Trust for Public Land is legally limited in the amount it can spend on campaigning for legislative and ballot measures. In 2000, the organization launched a 501(c)(4) affiliate, The Conservation Campaign, which is not limited in such spending. This affiliate entity is now called the Trust for Public Land Action Fund and frequently works with the Trust for Public Land to help pass local and state conservation finance measures.

Noteworthy projects 
 The 606/Bloomingdale Trail, Chicago
 Appalachian Trail additions in multiple states
 Atlanta Beltline
 Boston African American National Historic Site
 Boundary Waters Canoe Area Wilderness/Superior National Forest expansion, Minnesota
 Cape Cod National Seashore additions
 Civic Center Playgrounds, San Francisco
 Connecticut Lakes Headwaters, New Hampshire
 East Boston Greenway
 Everglades National Park expansion, Florida
 Green Alleys, Los Angeles
 Hollywood Sign/Cahuenga Peak, Los Angeles
 Kashia Coastal Reserve, Sonoma County, California
 Martin Luther King Jr. National Historical Park, Atlanta
 Montana Legacy Project, the largest private conservation transaction in U.S. history
 Neponset River Greenway, Boston and Milton, Massachusetts
 Newark Riverfront Park
 New York City Community Gardens
 New York City Playgrounds
 Pacific Crest Trail expansion
 The Preserve, Old Saybrook, Connecticut
 Queensway, New York City
 Runyon Canyon Park expansion, Los Angeles
 San Gabriel Mountains, Los Angeles County
 Sterling Forest State Park, Orange County, New York 
 Stonewall National Monument, New York City
 Yellowstone National Park ecosystem, Wyoming
 Yosemite National Park expansion, California
 Virgin Islands National Park expansion
 Walden Woods, Concord, Massachusetts
 Weir Farm National Historic Site, Wilton and Ridgefield, Connecticut
 Zion National Park expansion, Utah

References

External links
 
 Trust for Public Land ParkServe
 Trust for Public Land ParkScore
 Trust for Public Land Parkology
 Trust for Public Land ParkEvaluator
 Trust for Public Land Climate-Smart Cities Decision Support Tools
 Trust for Public Land Conservation Almanac 
 Trust for Public Land National Conservation Easement Database
 Trust for Public Land LandVote

Land trusts in the United States
Nature conservation organizations based in the United States
Environmental organizations based in California
Environmental organizations established in 1972
1972 establishments in the United States
Community building
Urban agriculture
Urban public parks
Urban planning in the United States
Cultural heritage of the United States